Jack Richard Buckner (born 22 September 1961) is a male retired British athlete.

Athletics career
Buckner was one of the many British athletes of the mid 1980s who dominated track and field.  Educated at St. Petroc's preparatory school in Cornwall and Worksop College in Nottinghamshire it was clear from a young age that Buckner was highly talented.  This was underlined when he clocked 4:16.90 for 5th place at The English Schools Championships at 1500m as a 15-year-old.  Three years later he won the National Junior 1500m title in 3:50.94, after an administrative blunder prevented him from competing in the English Schools' Championships of the same year.

After leaving Worksop College, Buckner attended Loughborough University, where he read geography. He later completed an MBA degree. During his first year at university Buckner won the University Athletic Union (UAU) 800m title in 1:51.30.  This title would prove to be his only real success during his university years, apart from setting a UK under 23 2000m record of 5:01.90 in 1983. It was when Buckner left university that he was able to concentrate fully on his running and by 1986 his 1500 m personal best had been reduced to 3:35.38. Although by today's standards this time would rank him very highly, in the 1980s standards were far higher, so much so that he was ranked 2 seconds outside the top three performers of Sebastian Coe, Steve Cram and Steve Ovett respectively.

Deciding that the 1500m was a difficult event to crack and due to his relative lack of 800m pace, Buckner decided to try his luck at the longer 5000m event. Representing England, the 1986 Commonwealth Games in Edinburgh, Scotland, was his first major race and he performed brilliantly finishing with a silver medal in 13:25.87 behind fellow countryman Steve Ovett. Hot on the heels of the Commonwealth Games in 1986 were the European Athletics Championships, which would prove to be a far tougher test. Following a 56-second last lap (see "1986 European Championships 5000m," a YouTube video uploaded by tommytempo1), "the ill fancied Buckner" went on to claim the gold medal in a championship best time of 13:10.15, a record which still stands to this day.

Buckner claimed a bronze medal at the 1987 World Championships in Athletics (13:27.74) and in 1988 he finished a brave 6th in the 5.000 metres in Seoul (13:23.85) after an injury ravaged season. This was how it would end for Buckner and despite making an appearance at the 1992 Summer Olympics after he came to within half a second of his best time from 1986, he progressed no further than the heats after a fall. This spelled the end of Buckner's short career as a distance athlete.

Shortly after his running career ended, Buckner worked for the sports giant Adidas before he and his family upped sticks and moved to New Zealand to concentrate on apple farming. In his own words this venture was "a disaster" and when they returned he was appointed project director of the athletics board.

Jack's younger brother Tom Buckner was also an international distance runner and gained recognition when he finished 5th at the 1994 Commonwealth Games 3000m steeplechase (8:29.84).  Both Tom and Jack have run sub 4-minute miles (Tom 3:58.90 at Portsmouth, UK in 1993) and Jack (3:51.57 at Koblenz, Germany in 1984). Tom and Jack Buckner were the first brothers since the 1950s to compete at the Olympics (in the 1992 Barcelona Olympic games).

Personal bests
800 metres – 1:49.80 (1981)
1000 metres – 2:18.88 (1982) UKAT 30th
1500 metres – 3:35.28 (1984) UKAT 19th
One mile – 3:51.57 (1984) UKAT 10th
2000 metres – 4:53.06 (1987) UKAT 3rd
Two miles – 8:17.12 (1986) UKAT 7th
3000 metres – 7:40.43 (1986) UKAT 6th
5000 metres – 13:10.15 (1986) UKAT 4th

NB UKAT denotes position on the United Kingdom all-time athletics lists.

References

 
 

1961 births
Living people
English male middle-distance runners
English male steeplechase runners
Olympic athletes of Great Britain
Athletes (track and field) at the 1988 Summer Olympics
Athletes (track and field) at the 1992 Summer Olympics
Commonwealth Games medallists in athletics
Athletes (track and field) at the 1986 Commonwealth Games
World Athletics Championships athletes for Great Britain
World Athletics Championships medalists
European Athletics Championships medalists
People from Wells, Somerset
Alumni of Loughborough University
People educated at Worksop College
Commonwealth Games silver medallists for England
Medallists at the 1986 Commonwealth Games